Setina aurata is a moth in the family Erebidae. It was described by Édouard Ménétries in 1832. It is found in Georgia (Adjara), Armenia, and north-eastern Turkey.

References

Moths described in 1832
Endrosina
Taxa named by Édouard Ménétries